Qumis may refer to:
Kumis, a fermented dairy product
Qumis, Iran, a historical city
Qumis (region), a small province of medieval Islamic Persia